Dali Owlad Mohammad Hoseyn (also Romanized as Dalī Owlād Moḩammad Ḩoseyn) is a village in Tolbozan Rural District, Golgir District, Masjed Soleyman County, Khuzestan Province, Iran. As of the 2006 census, its population was 15, in 4 families.

References 

Populated places in Masjed Soleyman County